Shadow Zone is a series of 13 children's horror fiction books written in the 1990s by several authors using the pen name J. R. Black. 

Each book is a different story, with new characters. A child or a few children meet a monster who asks for help and usually threatens them or their family. Aggressive at the beginning, they may finally be nice or touching. The books use black humor.

Two of the books, The Undead Express and My Teacher Ate My Homework, have been made into films.

List of titles in the Shadow Zone series

 The Ghost of Chicken Liver Hill: Tony is dragged into an eerie mystery when the ghost of a teenager named Buddy Parker begins to haunt him.
 Guess Who's Dating a Werewolf?
 The Witches Next Door: Jennifer becomes the target of two witches who want to make her one of them.
 Revenge of the Computer Phantoms: It is digital disaster when Mike's computer game comes to life.
 The Undead Express: Compulsive liar Zach accidentally stumbles into a vampire community and befriends a bloodsucker named Valentine. But Valentine may not have Zach's best intentions in mind....  
 Good Night, Mummy!: Blaise may regret wanting some excitement in her life when a mummy asks for her help.
 One Slimy Summer: Max and Diana must find a way to return a tentacled monster back to its native realm.
 Bite of the Living Dead: Josh learns that the new decorations in his backyard are actually tombstones. And the bodies are not quite at rest....
 Alien Under My Bed: As if her life has not been going through enough changes, Hayley discovers her room has been chosen as a home away from home for an alien.
 Scream Around the Campfire: Gina and Frank's summer turns terrifying quick after they see a large, hairy monster in the woods.
 My Teacher Ate My Homework
 Skeleton in My Closet
 Attack of the Mutant Bugs

Similarity to Goosebumps
7
This series is similar in style and tone to the very popular Goosebumps series. Other children's horror series from the 1990s include Are You Afraid of the Dark?, Bone Chillers, Deadtime Stories, Shivers, Spinetinglers, Spooksville and Graveyard School.

External links
 The Undead Express on IMDb
 My Teacher Ate My Homework on IMDb

See also
 My Teacher Ate My Homework

Series of children's books
Juvenile series